Brooke Rangi (born 7 September 1982) is a former association football player who represented New Zealand at international level.

Rangi made her Football Ferns début in a 0–2 loss to Australia on 18 February 2004, and finished her international career with three caps to her credit.

Achievements in other sports 
She also represented her county successfully in athletics.

References

1982 births
Living people
New Zealand women's international footballers
New Zealand women's association footballers
Women's association footballers not categorized by position